Scigress, stylized SCiGRESS, is a software suite for molecular modelling, computational chemistry, drug design, and materials science, a successor to Computer Aided Chemistry (CAChe) software.

About
Scigress is a molecular modeling suite for both experimental and computational chemists and biochemists. It enables researchers to study and design wide range of molecular systems:
 organic
 inorganic
 polymers
 proteins
 metals, oxides, and ceramics

Functions

 Intuitive, easy to learn, property driven user interface including molecule editor and batch processing.
 Theory levels: DFT, semi-empirical, molecular mechanics and dynamics.
 Determination of low energy conformations and thermodynamic properties.
 Calculare and 3D-visualize electronic properties: partial charges, orbitals, electron densities, and electrostatic surfaces and more.
 Analysis of chemical reactions: transition states and intrinsic reaction coordinates.
 Spectroscopic properties analysis: IR, UV-VIS, NMR.
 Study of phase transitions, expansion, crystal defects, compressibility, tensile strength, adsorption, absorption, thermal conductivity.
 Protein handling and protein-ligand docking on quantum level.
 Multiple presentation-quality visualizing options and movie creation.

Ability summary
Molecular mechanics
MM2, MM3
Semi-empirical methods
DFT
Study of reactivity
Fukui function, partial charge
Protein-ligand docking, molecular dynamics
User-friendly interface
Presentation quality graphics
Quantitative structure–activity relationship (QSAR)
Automated model builders
 Polymers (homopolymers, block polymers, dendrimers), proteins, crystals
Needleman–Wunsch alignment

See also

References

External links 
 

Computational chemistry
Computational chemistry software
Molecular modelling software
Physics software